"I Quit" is a song by British female pop band Hepburn. The song was written by Phil Thornalley, who produced the track alongside Notodog, and Colin Campsie. Included on Hepburn's debut and only studio album, Hepburn (1999), the song also appears on the soundtrack to the American supernatural drama television series Buffy the Vampire Slayer.

"I Quit" was originally offered to Australian singer Natalie Imbruglia, who turned down the track. Hepburn recorded the song instead and released it as their debut single on 17 May 1999 through Columbia Records. Commercially, the song reached number eight on the UK Singles Chart and also charted in France, peaking at number 80. The song was also released in the United States in October 1999 but failed to generate success.

Release and reception
Columbia Records released "I Quit" in the United Kingdom on 17 May 1999. Critically, British trade paper Music Week compared the song's "angry" chorus to Alanis Morissette's music, noting the song's maturity and calling it "instantly catchy and hummable". UK chart columnist James Masterton wrote that the rhyming couplet "But you turned into another liar / And you came on like a new Messiah" was the "coolest" lyric of the 23 May 1999 chart week, when "I Quit" debuted at its peak of number eight on the UK Singles Chart. The song remained on the UK chart for nine weeks and is Hepburn's only top-20 single.

In June 1999, Hepburn promoted the song by performing it live on music programme Top of the Pops. In the United States, TVT Records serviced "I Quit" to rock radio stations on 5 October 1999, but it did not experience success. In mid-2000, the song charted on the French Singles Chart for two nonconsecutive weeks, peaking at number 80 in May.

Track listings

UK CD1
 "I Quit" – 3:53
 "Sleeping Beauty" – 3:20
 "Butterfly" – 3:34

UK CD2
 "I Quit" – 3:53
 "Cold World" – 5:35
 "I Quit" (Dave Sears 'On Time Mix') – 7:38

UK cassette single
 "I Quit" – 3:53
 "Sleeping Beauty" – 3:20

European CD single
 "I Quit" – 3:53
 "Butterfly" – 3:34

Australian CD single
 "I Quit" – 3:53
 "Sleeping Beauty" – 3:20
 "Cold World" – 5:35
 "I Quit" (Dave Sears 'On Time Mix') – 7:38

Personnel
Personnel are lifted from the Australian CD single liner notes.
 Phil Thornalley – writing, production
 Colin Campsie – writing
 Notodog – production
 Dave Bascombe – mixing
 Simon Fowler – photography

Charts

Release history

References

1999 debut singles
1999 songs
British pop songs
Columbia Records singles
Song recordings produced by Phil Thornalley
Songs written by Colin Campsie
Songs written by Phil Thornalley
TVT Records singles